Nimrod was launched in 1824. Ownership transferred from Port Glasgow to Leith in 1834, and then in 1839 to Sydney, New South Wales. She spent much of her subsequent career trading between Australian and New Zealand ports. 

On 20 March 1840, Nimrod, of 174 tons (bm), Hay, master, arrived at Port Nicholson (Wellington), from Sydney.

In 1840, the brig Nimrod, of 174 tons, Lancaster, master, and origin Sydney, departed on 25 October with 12 passengers for the Bay of Islands.

The Sydney Morning Herald reported on 14 November 1842 that parties in the Bay of Islands had purchased Nimrod for use as a whaler. In 1846 she may have been re-registered in Hobart as a whaler. On 25 March 1846, Nimrod, McLeod, master, of 161 tons, departed Hobart in ballast.

Nimrod, Alexander McLeod, master, left Hobart on 26 December 1849 on a whaling voyage to Holdfast Bay. She returned on 22 September 1850.

Fate
Nimrod was wrecked off the coast of the Horne Islands, north west of Fiji in July 1854. "The Nimrod, had been lying at anchor off Horn's Island, and was getting under way, when her anchor got hooked amongst some rocks, and sail being upon the vessel, she canted and ran stern on".

Notes, citations, and references
Notes

Citations

References
Heflin, Wilson Lumpkin, Mary K. Bercaw Edwards, & Thomas Farel Heffernan (2004) Herman Melville's Whaling Years. (Vanderbilt University Press). 
McNab, Robert (1913) The Old Whaling Days: A History of Southern New Zealand from 1830 to 1840. (Wellington: Whitcombe and Tombs).

 1824 ships
Whaling ships
Age of Sail merchant ships
Merchant ships of the United Kingdom
Maritime incidents in July 1854